Marnix Lameire (born 3 March 1955) is a Belgian former professional road cyclist. He most notably won a stage of the 1989 Vuelta a España and the Kampioenschap van Vlaanderen in 1988.

Major results

1987
 1st De Kustpijl
 1st Stage 2 Vuelta a Aragón
 1st Gullegem Koerse
 3rd Scheldeprijs
1988
 1st Kampioenschap van Vlaanderen
 1st Stages 1 & 3 Vuelta a Burgos
 3rd Tour de Vendée
 3rd Brussels–Ingooigem
 3rd Paris–Brussels
 4th Paris–Tours
1989
 1st Stages 2 & 6 Vuelta a Aragón
 1st Stage 1 Vuelta a España
 2nd Nationale Sluitingsprijs
1990
 1st De Kustpijl
1991
 1st Grote Prijs Marcel Kint

References

External links

1955 births
Living people
Belgian male cyclists
People from Knokke-Heist
Belgian Vuelta a España stage winners
Cyclists from West Flanders